Prisdorf is a municipality in the district of Pinneberg, in Schleswig-Holstein, Germany. It was first mentioned in documents in 1342.

References

Pinneberg (district)